Peder Schall  (1762–1820) was a Danish composer.

See also
List of Danish composers

References
This article was initially translated from the Danish Wikipedia.

Danish composers
Male composers
1762 births
1820 deaths